The Beriev MBR-7 (sometimes Beriev MS-8) was a Soviet short-range reconnaissance/bomber flying boat developed by the Beriev design bureau at Taganrog. Designed as a successor to the MBR-2 but it did not go into production due to lack of engines.

Development
The MBR-7 (Morskoy Blizhnii Razvedchik - naval short-range reconnaissance) was a similar configuration to the earlier MBR-2 but was a more advanced design. A mainly wooden cantilever shoulder-wing monoplane flying-boat. The Klimov M-103 inline piston engine was mounted on struts above the wing driving a pusher propeller. The pilot in an enclosed cockpit in the nose had access to a fixed forward-firing machine gun, the observer/gunner sat underneath a glazed canopy. The observers canopy slid forward to access a pintle-mounted ShKAS machine-gun.

It had an excellent performance but due to the lack of supply of Klimov engines the decision was made to continue building the MBR-2 and the MBR-7 did not go into production.

Operators

Soviet Navy

Specifications

See also

References

Notes

Bibliography

 

MBR-7
Flying boats
1930s Soviet military reconnaissance aircraft
Single-engined pusher aircraft
High-wing aircraft
Aircraft first flown in 1937